The consensus 1953 NCAA Men's Basketball All-American team, as determined by aggregating the results of six major All-American teams.  To earn "consensus" status, a player must win honors from a majority of the following teams: the Associated Press, Look Magazine, The United Press International, the Newspaper Enterprise Association (NEA), Collier's Magazine and the International News Service.

1953 Consensus All-America team

Individual All-America teams

AP Honorable Mention:

 Irv Bemoras, Illinois
 B. H. Born, Kansas
 Don Bragg, UCLA
 John Clune, Navy
 Ron Feiereisel, DePaul
 Ken Flower, Southern California
 Dickie Hemric, Wake Forest
 Cob Jarvis, Mississippi
 Johnny Kerr, Illinois
 Tom Marshall, Western Kentucky
 Bob Mattick, Oklahoma A&M
 Bob McKeen, California
 Chuck Mencel, Minnesota
 Jack Molinas, Columbia
 Zippy Morocco, Georgia
 Togo Palazzi, Holy Cross
 Joe Richey, Brigham Young
 Dick Ricketts, Duquesne
 Arnold Short, Oklahoma City
 Art Spoelstra, Western Kentucky

See also
 1952–53 NCAA men's basketball season

References

NCAA Men's Basketball All-Americans
All-Americans